Anna Blackburne (1726 – 30 December 1793) was an English naturalist.

Life
Anna Blackburne was born at Orford Hall, Orford, Warrington, Lancashire, the daughter of John Blackburne and Jane (born Ashton). Her father was a wealthy Cheshire salt dealer, who studied natural history and had famous greenhouses admired by Thomas Pennant (1726–1798).

Inspired by her father, she devoted herself to study natural history in a more systematic way. To improve her understanding of the system developed by Carl von Linné (1707–1778), she learned Latin.

She corresponded with Carl Linnaeus and Johann Reinhold Forster (1729–1798), who encouraged her to publish her entomological observations and devote herself to the museum of Oxford Hall.  .

Her additions to the insect collections were especially notable, thanks to specimens sent to her by Peter Simon Pallas (1741–1811). Her brother Ashton, who had gone to live in the United States of America, also sent her many specimens, especially of  birds, that were eventually described by Pennant. She sent Linné specimens of birds and insects that were not described in his Systema Naturae.

She died in Warrington in 1793.

Legacy
Johan Christian Fabricius (1745–1808), a pupil of Carl Linnaeus, dedicated the beetle Geotrupes blackburnii to her in 1781. Dendroica fusca, the Blackburnian warbler – described by Philipp Ludwig Statius Müller (1725–1776) – is also named in her honour.

References

Attribution

External links

Wystrach, V. P. "Anna Blackburne (1726–1793) — a neglected patroness of natural history". JSBNH 8 (2): 148–168 (May 1977).

English naturalists
English entomologists
Women entomologists
1726 births
1793 deaths
People from Warrington